Stewart House may refer to:
in Australia
Stewart House (Australia), a children's institution in New South Wales

in the United States
(by state then city)
Stewart-Blanton House, Carrollton, Alabama, listed on the National Register of Historic Places (NRHP) in Pickens County
Buell-Stallings-Stewart House, Greenville, Alabama, listed on the NRHP in Butler County
Amelia Stewart House, Mobile, Alabama, listed on the NRHP in Mobile County
Tankersley-Stewart House, Hunt, Arkansas, listed on the NRHP in Johnson County
Stewart House (Little Rock, Arkansas), listed on the NRHP in Pulaski County
Giboney-Robertson-Stewart House, Wynne, Arkansas, listed on the NRHP in Cross County
George C. Stewart House (1909), Montecito, California, a Frank Lloyd Wright house
James Stewart, Jr., House, Christina, Delaware, listed on the NRHP in New Castle County
James Stewart House (Glasgow, Delaware), listed on the NRHP in New Castle County
Dr. James A. Stewart House, Portal, Georgia, listed on the NRHP in Bulloch County
A.H. Stewart House, Parma, Idaho, listed on the NRHP in Canyon County
Robinson-Stewart House, Carmi, Illinois, listed on the NRHP in White County
Minnie Stewart House, Monmouth, Illinois, listed on the NRHP in Warren County
Stewart-Studebaker House, Bluffton, Indiana, listed on the NRHP in Wells County
Stewart Manor (Charles B. Sommers House), Indianapolis, Indiana, listed on the NRHP in Marion County
J. W. Stewart House, Davenport, Iowa, listed on the NRHP in Scott County
Frank Stewart House, Washington, Iowa, listed on the NRHP in Washington County
Dr. Edward S. Stewart House, Fairview, Kentucky, listed on the NRHP in Christian County
Stewart House (Henderson, Kentucky), listed on the NRHP in Henderson County
G. W. Stewart House, Shelbyville, Kentucky, listed on the NRHP in Shelby County
Heyman-Stewart House, Clinton, Louisiana, listed on the NRHP in East Feliciana Parish
Stewart-Dougherty House, Baton Rouge, Louisiana, listed on the NRHP in East Baton Rouge Parish
Peggy Stewart House, Annapolis, Maryland, listed on the NRHP in Anne Arundel County
Frank H. Stewart House, Newton, Massachusetts, listed on the NRHP in Middlesex County
Henry Stewart House, Waltham, Massachusetts, listed on the NRHP in Middlesex County
William E. Stewart House, North Mankato, Minnesota, listed on the NRHP in Nicollet County
Stewart-Anderson House, Tupelo, Mississippi, listed on the NRHP in Lee County
Stewart House (Toms River, New Jersey), listed on the NRHP in Ocean County
Stewart Cobblestone Farmhouse, Mendon, New York, listed on the NRHP in Monroe County
Stewart House and Howard–Stewart Family Cemetery, South Jefferson, New York, listed on the NRHP in Schoharie County
Graves-Stewart House, Clinton, North Carolina, listed on the NRHP in Sampson County
Stewart-Hawley-Malloy House, Laurinburg, North Carolina, listed on the NRHP in Scotland County
Savage-Stewart House, Canaanville, Ohio, listed on the NRHP in Athens County
Stewart-Hanson Farm, Stow, Ohio, listed on the NRHP in Summit County
LaSells D. Stewart House, Cottage Grove, Oregon, listed on the NRHP in Lane County
John Stewart Houses (Philadelphia, Pennsylvania), listed on the NRHP in Philadelphia County
James Stewart House (Lexington, South Carolina), listed on the NRHP in Lexington County
Stewart House (Newberry, South Carolina), formerly listed on the NRHP in Newberry County
John Stewart House (Decatur, Tennessee), listed on the NRHP in Meigs County
Dr. James M. and Dove Stewart House, Katy, Texas, listed on the NRHP in Harris County
Stewart-Woolley House, Kanab, Utah, listed on the NRHP in Kane County
LeConte Stewart House, Kaysville, Utah, listed on the NRHP in Davis County
Stewart-Hills House, Orem, Utah, listed on the NRHP in Utah County
Stewart Ranch buildings, near Woodland, Utah, all listed on the NRHP in Wasatch County
Barnard J. Stewart Ranch House
Charles B. Stewart Ranch House
Samuel W. Stewart Ranch House
Stewart-Hewlett Ranch Dairy Barn
Stewart Ranch Foreman's House
Lester F. and Margaret Stewart Hewlett Ranch House
Ethelbert White and William M. Stewart Ranch House
Stewart-Hinton House, Petersburg, Virginia, listed on the NRHP
Stewart-Lee House, Richmond, Virginia, listed on the NRHP
David Stewart Farm, Triadelphia, West Virginia, listed on the NRHP in Ohio County
Stewart Hall (Morgantown, West Virginia), listed on the NRHP in Monongalia County
Hiram C. Stewart House, Wausau, Wisconsin, listed on the NRHP in Marathon County
Elinore Pruitt Stewart Homestead, McKinnon, Wyoming, listed on the NRHP in Sweetwater County

See also
James Stewart House (disambiguation)
John Stewart House (disambiguation)